2023 is the seventh year in the history of Legacy Fighting Alliance, a mixed martial arts promotion based in the United States.

List of events

Legacy Fighting Alliance 149: Bunes vs. Horiuchi

LFA 149: Bunes vs. Horiuchi is a mixed martial arts event promoted by Legacy Fighting Alliance and will take place on January 6, 2023. It aired on UFC Fight Pass.

Background
A LFA Flyweight Championship for the vacant title between Felipe Bunes and Yuma Horiuchi headlined the event.

Fight card

Legacy Fighting Alliance 150: Farias vs. Sweeney

LFA 150: Farias vs. Sweeney is a mixed martial arts event promoted by Legacy Fighting Alliance and will take place on January 13, 2023. It aired on UFC Fight Pass.

Background

Results

Legacy Fighting Alliance 151: Delano vs. Santos

LFA 151: Delano vs. Santos is a mixed martial arts event promoted by Legacy Fighting Alliance and will take place on January 28, 2023. It aired on UFC Fight Pass.

Fight card

Legacy Fighting Alliance 152: Valente vs. Bekoev

LFA 152: Valente vs. Bekoev is a mixed martial arts event promoted by Legacy Fighting Alliance and will take place on February 10, 2023. It aired on UFC Fight Pass.

Fight card

Legacy Fighting Alliance 153: Mariscal vs. Faria

LFA 153: Mariscal vs. Faria is a mixed martial arts event promoted by Legacy Fighting Alliance and will take place on February 17, 2023. It aired on UFC Fight Pass.

Fight card

Legacy Fighting Alliance 154: Fernando vs. Silva

LFA 154: Fernando vs. Silva is a mixed martial arts event promoted by Legacy Fighting Alliance and will take place on March 10, 2023. It aired on UFC Fight Pass.

Fight card

Legacy Fighting Alliance 155: do Nascimento vs. Hodge

LFA 155: do Nascimento vs. Hodge is a mixed martial arts event promoted by Legacy Fighting Alliance and will take place on March 24, 2023. It aired on UFC Fight Pass.

Fight card

Legacy Fighting Alliance 156: Fuller vs. Waters 

LFA 156: Fuller vs. Waters is a mixed martial arts event promoted by Legacy Fighting Alliance and will take place on April 14, 2023. It aired on UFC Fight Pass.

Fight card

Legacy Fighting Alliance 157: Croden vs. Cavalcanti 

LFA 157: Croden vs. Cavalcanti is a mixed martial arts event promoted by Legacy Fighting Alliance and will take place on April 21, 2023. It aired on UFC Fight Pass.

Fight card

See also
 2023 in UFC
 2023 in Bellator MMA
 2023 in ONE Championship
 2023 in Absolute Championship Akhmat
 2023 in Konfrontacja Sztuk Walki
 2023 in Rizin Fighting Federation
 2023 in AMC Fight Nights
 2023 in Brave Combat Federation
 2023 in Road FC
 2023 Professional Fighters League season
 2023 in Eagle Fighting Championship

References

External links
  Legacy Fighting Alliance Official website

  
2023 sport-related lists 
2023 in mixed martial arts